The  is a large multi-purpose public cultural facility in Chūō-ku, Niigata, Japan, which opened on 1 December 1967.

Facilities
The main concert hall seats 1,730, and the smaller hall seats 300.

History
Construction of the building started on 20 September 1966. The total construction cost was 923 million yen, and was partially funded using relief donations following the June 1964 Niigata earthquake. The building opened on 21 November 1967.

Performances
Musical artists and groups that have appeared on stage at the Niigata Prefectural Civic Center include the following.

 Iron Maiden december 10 1982.
 A-ha, World tour 1986 – 1987, 11 July 1987
 Mark Morris Dance Group, Japan Tour with Yo-Yo Ma, 7 June 2002
 Dir En Grey, Tour 05: It Withers and Withers, 10 April 2005
 Kodo, One Earth Tour 2011, 21 December 2011
 Every Little Thing, 15th Anniversary Concert Tour 2011-2012 "Ordinary", 3 April 2012
 Blast!, 20 July 2012
 Hideaki Tokunaga, Concert Tour 2012, 28 October 2012
 Chage and Aska, Aska Concert Tour 2012-2013, 15 February 2013

Access
The complex is located within Hakusan Park, and the nearest station to the Niigata Prefectural Civic Center is Hakusan Station on the JR Echigo Line, 15 minutes' walk away. It is 15 minutes by car or bus from the main Niigata Station.

References

External links
  

Concert halls in Japan
Buildings and structures in Niigata (city)
Music venues completed in 1967
1967 establishments in Japan